The Edward Harriman Memorial is installed outside the Utah State Capitol in Salt Lake City, in the U.S. state of Utah.

References

External links

 

Monuments and memorials in Utah
Outdoor sculptures in Salt Lake City
Sculptures of men in the United States
Utah State Capitol